Fiorentino may refer to :

Places and jurisdictions 
 Fiorentino, a commune of the Republic of San Marino

 in Italy 
 Fiorentino di Puglia = (Castel) Fiorentino, a Byzantine fortress that became the commune of Torremaggiore, province of Foggia
 the Diocese of Fiorentino with seat in the above Apulian town, now a Latin Catholic titular see
 Castiglion Fiorentino: a walled city in eastern Tuscany, in the province of Arezzo
 Montelupo Fiorentino: a comune (municipality) in the province of Firenze (Florence) in Tuscany

Other uses 
 Italian adjective meaning 'Florentine', i.e. from Firenze (Florence), Tuscany
 Fiorentino (surname)